Caux Seine Agglo (before November 2017: Communauté d'agglomération Caux vallée de Seine) is a communauté d'agglomération in the Seine-Maritime department of the Normandy region of northern France. It was created as a communauté de communes on January 1, 2008. It is a communauté d'agglomération since January 2017. It evolved from an amalgamation of three earlier communautés de communes - Port-Jérôme, Caudebec-en-Caux and Canton of Bolbec. Its area is 574.3 km2. Its population was 77,906 in 2018.

Participants 
Since 1 January 2017, the communauté comprises the following 50 communes (with their INSEE codes): 

 Alvimare (76002)
 Anquetierville (76022)
 Arelaune-en-Seine (76401)
 Bernières (76082)
 Beuzeville-la-Grenier (76090)
 Beuzevillette (76092)
 Bolbec (76114)
 Bolleville (76115)
 Cléville (76181)
 Cliponville (76182)
 Envronville (76236)
 Foucart (76279)
 La Frénaye (76281)
 Grand-Camp (76318)
 Gruchet-le-Valasse (76329)
 Hattenville (76342)
 Heurteauville (76362)
 Lanquetot (76382)
 Lillebonne (76384)
 Lintot (76388)
 Louvetot (76398)
 Maulévrier-Sainte-Gertrude (76418)
 Mélamare (76421)
 Mirville (76439)
 Nointot (76468)
 Norville (76471)
 Notre-Dame-de-Bliquetuit (76473)
 Parc-d'Anxtot (76494)
 Petiville (76499)
 Port-Jérôme-sur-Seine (76476)
 Raffetot (76518)
 Rives-en-Seine (76164)
 Rouville (76543)
 Saint-Antoine-la-Forêt (76556)
 Saint-Arnoult (76557)
 Saint-Aubin-de-Crétot (76559)
 Saint-Eustache-la-Forêt (76576)
 Saint-Gilles-de-Crétot (76585)
 Saint-Jean-de-Folleville (76592)
 Saint-Jean-de-la-Neuville (76593)
 Saint-Maurice-d'Ételan (76622)
 Saint-Nicolas-de-la-Haie (76626)
 Saint-Nicolas-de-la-Taille (76627)
 Tancarville (76684)
 Terres-de-Caux (76258)
 Trémauville (76710)
 La Trinité-du-Mont (76712)
 Trouville (76715)
 Vatteville-la-Rue (76727)
 Yébleron (76751)

See also
Communes of the Seine-Maritime department

References

External links
Tourist office website

Caux vallee de Seine
Caux vallee de Seine